The UR GD class, known later as the UR / KUR EB3 class, and later still as the EAR 24 class, was a class of  gauge  steam locomotives built for the Uganda Railway (UR).  It was a larger and modified version of the earlier, experimental, UR GC class.

Service history
The first batch of GD class engines entered service on the UR in 1923. Heavier rail had been laid on the UR main line in preparation for their arrival. Further batches entered service progressively, including after the UR was renamed the Kenya-Uganda Railway (KUR) in 1926.

The class was the most numerous of all the KUR, and later East African Railways (EAR), classes in service, and became the maids of all work. Nearly 60 years after the class's introduction, the class was still in use on Kenya Railways (KR), one of the EAR's successors.

See also
History of rail transport in Tanzania
Rail transport in Kenya
Rail transport in Uganda

References

Notes

Bibliography

External links

Kenya-Uganda Railway locomotives
Metre gauge steam locomotives
Nasmyth, Wilson and Company locomotives
Railway locomotives introduced in 1923
Steam locomotives of Kenya
Steam locomotives of Uganda
Uganda Railway locomotives
Vulcan Foundry locomotives
4-8-0 locomotives